Long List of Heartaches is the second album released by the Grascals and the second album they released on Rounder Records. The album features a variety of guests, from George Jones to the Jordanaires. This album was released shortly before the band won the IBMA Entertainer of the Year Award honor in 2006.

Track listing

Home  (2:15)
Long List of Heartaches  (2:38)
You Don't Have Very Far to Go  (3:18)
Will You Be Loving Another Man  (2:20)
Being Me  (3:44)
Did You Forget God Today  (3:15)
Hard Times  (3:40)
Cut Your Wheels  (2:57)
Don't Tell Mama  (4:04)
Roll Muddy River  (3:08)
My Night to Howl  (2:29)
Keep Me from Blowing Away  (3:18)
Hoedown in Motown  (3:13)

Personnel
Jamie Johnson - Vocals/guitar
Terry Eldredge - Vocals/guitar
Jimmy Mattingly - fiddle
Danny Roberts - mandolin
Dave Talbot - Harmony/banjo
Terry Smith - Harmony/bass
George Jones - "Don't Tell Mama"
The Jordanaires - "Did You Forget God Today"
Dierks Bentley - "Being Me"
Steve Wariner - "Hoedown in Motown"

Chart performance

2006 albums
The Grascals albums
Rounder Records albums